The 2014 Pro Bowl was the National Football League's all-star game for the 2013 season. It took place at 2:30 pm local time on January 26 at Aloha Stadium in Honolulu, Hawaii. The game was televised nationally by NBC and was the final Pro Bowl on network television before ABC’s airing in 2018 as part of a simulcast with sister network ESPN, whose parent company Disney currently holds domestic television rights to the game.

Significant changes to the Pro Bowl format were adopted in an attempt to make the game more "fan-friendly". These changes were proposed by National Football League Players Association president Dominique Foxworth and developed in partnership between the league and the player's union.

The most significant change was a switch to a "fantasy draft" format rather than pitting AFC all-stars against NFC all-stars. Hall of Fame players Jerry Rice and Deion Sanders were chosen as honorary team captains, and joined by two active players each to assist in their selections. Chuck Pagano of the AFC South winning Indianapolis Colts coached Team Sanders, while Ron Rivera of the NFC South winning Carolina Panthers coached Team Rice. These coaches were selected for coaching the highest seeded teams to lose in the Divisional round of the playoffs, which has been the convention since the 2010 Pro Bowl.

Team Rice won the game 22–21.

Rule changes
The rosters now consist of 44 players per squad, with an additional defensive back added.
Two former players, Jerry Rice and Deion Sanders, drafted players to be members of the teams. Each was assisted by two player captains, and a top player from NFL.com fantasy football. The player captains were the top two offensive and defensive players from teams not in the conference championships, as determined by a vote; Drew Brees and Robert Quinn represented Team Rice, while Team Sanders was represented by Jamaal Charles and J. J. Watt. The draft was held on January 21 and 22, 2014, with the selection of top offensive and defensive positions held during a primetime broadcast on the second day, aired by NFL Network.
A "Game within the Game" format saw the addition of two-minute warnings to all four quarters, with a change of possession to start each quarter. The intention of this rule is to encourage four exciting two-minute drills.
No kickoffs. A coin toss will determine which team is awarded possession first, and the ball will be placed on the 25-yard line at the start of each quarter and after scoring plays.
The defense is now permitted to play "cover two" and "press" coverage. In the previous years, only the "man" coverage was permitted, except for goal line situations.
Beginning at the two-minute mark of every quarter, if the offense does not gain at least one yard, the clock stops as if the play were an incomplete pass.
A 35-second and 25-second play clock is used instead of the usual 40-second and 25-second clock.
The game clock does not stop on quarterback sacks outside of the final 2 minutes of regulation.

Summary
To begin the game, the coin toss was won by Team Sanders.  They decided to defer to the second half, so Team Rice started with the ball.

The game featured six interceptions and nine sacks, while the 22–21 score was the lowest since the 2006 Pro Bowl, which ended with a 23–17 NFC win.

Scoring summary
The scores broken down by quarter:

Rosters

Team Deion Sanders

Team Rice

Selected but did not participate

Notes:
(C) signifies the player was selected as a captain
Replacement selection due to injury or vacancy
Injured player; selected but did not play
Selected but did not play because his team advanced to Super Bowl XLVIII (see Pro Bowl "Player Selection" section)

Number of selections per team

Broadcasting
The game was televised nationally by NBC and was the final Pro Bowl on network television until 2018. ESPN took over the exclusive broadcast rights to the Pro Bowl, effective in 2015, and eventually began simulcasting the game on ABC in 2018.
In France, the game was televised by BeIN Sport, and in the United Kingdom and Ireland, by Sky Sports. In Slovenia, the game was televised by Šport TV, and in Germany, by Sport1 US.

Westwood One radio also broadcast the game nationally.

Ratings
7pm; Cris Collinsworth's Sunday Night Football Special
HH: 3.6; Viewers: 5.555 million

7:30pm; 2014 Pro Bowl
HH: 6.6; Viewers: 11.378 million 

10:47pm; Pro Bowl Post-Game
HH: 4.7; Viewers: 7.822 million
7:30 – HH: 6.3; Viewers: 10.809 million
8:00 – HH: 7.1; Viewers: 12.502 million
8:30 – HH: 7.1; Viewers: 12.588 million
9:00 – HH: 6.4; Viewers: 11.248 million
9:30 – HH: 6.4; Viewers: 10.961 million
10:00 – HH: 6.3; Viewers: 10.514 million
10:30-10:47 – HH: 6.5; Viewers: 10.750 million

References

External links
Official website for the Pro Bowl
Game box score

Pro Bowl
Pro Bowl
Pro Bowl
Pro Bowl
Pro Bowl
American football competitions in Honolulu
January 2014 sports events in Oceania